TPC-5CN or Trans-Pacific Cable 5 Cable Network is a submarine telecommunications cable system linking Japan, Guam, Hawaii and mainland United States.

It has landing points in:
Ninomiya, Kanagawa Prefecture, Japan
Bandon, Coos County, Oregon, United States
San Luis Obispo, San Luis Obispo County, California, United States
Keawaula/Yokohama Beach, Wai'anae, Honolulu County, Oahu, Hawaii, United States
Tumon Bay, Tumon, Tamuning, Guam
Miyazaki, Miyazaki Prefecture, Japan

It has a transmission capacity of 5 Gbit/s, and a total cable length of 22,500 km. It started operation on 31 December 1996.

External links

References
 
 
 
 

Submarine communications cables in the Pacific Ocean
Japan–United States relations
1996 establishments in California
1996 establishments in Oregon
1996 establishments in Guam
1996 establishments in Hawaii
1996 establishments in Japan